Staraya Derevnya (literally translate - Old Village) is a station on the Frunzensko-Primorskaya Line of Saint Petersburg Metro, opened on January 14, 1999.

Transport 
Buses: 93, 101A, 101Э, 112, 125, 126, 154, 154A, 166, 216A, 217, 223, 235, 258, 279, 294. Trolleybuses: 23, 25, 40. Trams: 18.

Saint Petersburg Metro stations
Railway stations in Russia opened in 1999
Railway stations located underground in Russia